Telemetro is a television network headquartered in Panama City, Panama, with repeaters throughout the country. The station broadcasts in NTSC format and in Panama City also in DVB-T format. In 1996 Telemetro and RPC TV merged and formed Corporacion Medcom.

Main programming consists on news, novelas, and local reality shows; it has a direct rivalry with TVN since it has similar programming.

History 
In 1981, Nicolas Gonzalez Revilla founded Telemetro as a metropolitan VHF scrambled pay-per-view channel, this format was not successful and was replaced with regular broadcasting, by 1983 reached Colon Province, by 1990 expanded to Central Provinces and finally in 1992, covered Chiriqui and Bocas del Toro to have national coverage. The channel in its first year was a subscription channel focused on movies and other cultural programming and broadcast for 6 hours a day without commercial breaks, but this wasn't profitable and thus it expanded its programming to include telenovelas and news shows and it also expanded its broadcasting hours to 20–24 hours a day and added commercial breaks.

Specific programming

News 
Telemetro Reporta Matutino (Morning News): Delia Muñoz, Alvaro Alvarado and Virna Quintero.
Telemetro Reporta Mediodía (Noon News): Vanessa Calviño and Massiel Rodriguez.
Telemetro Reporta Estelar (Evening News): Jenia Nenzen and Jose Escobar.

Other Programming
 Tu Mañana (Morning Show)
 Calle 7 (Reality Show)
 Various Disney TV Series
 Various Disney and Other Companies' Movies
 La rosa de Guadalupe
 Miss Universe

Mall TV

Originally launched in 2005 as a kids programming channel under the brand of Tele 7, In 2011 the channel was relaunched as Mall TV  to feature local shopping stores advertisements, real state development, health clinics and infomercials. The channel was previously only available to Cable Onda customers, which was also owned by Medcom. The channel is also available in many provinces by cable on Cable Onda. In 2017 its over-the-air signal was replaced with Oye TV, a variety channel. It closed in 2020.

References

External links 
 

Television stations in Panama
Mass media in Panama City